Listrocerum psathyroides is a species of beetle in the family Cerambycidae. It was described by Lepesme in 1950. It is known from the Ivory Coast.

References

Endemic fauna of Ivory Coast
Dorcaschematini
Beetles described in 1950